Julian Brandt (born 2 May 1996) is a German professional footballer who plays as a left winger or attacking midfielder for Bundesliga club Borussia Dortmund and the Germany national team.

Brandt made over 55 combined appearances for Germany's youth teams, playing at every level from U15 to U21. He was a member of the squad that won the UEFA European Under-19 Championship in 2014.

Club career

Early career
Julian Brandt was born and raised in Bremen. In his youth, he played in his hometown at SC Borgfeld and then at FC Oberneuland before he joined the youth academy (Nachwuchsleistungszentrum) of VfL Wolfsburg.

Bayer Leverkusen
In January 2014, Brandt moved to Bayer Leverkusen during the January transfer window for a fee of €350,000, where he signed a professional contract until 2019. He made his professional debut on 15 February 2014 in the Bundesliga against Schalke 04. He replaced Son Heung-min after 82 minutes in a 1–2 home defeat. Three days later he made his debut in the European Cup when he came on in the first knockout round first leg against Paris Saint-Germain in the UEFA Champions League. On 4 April 2014, he scored his first goal for Bayer Leverkusen, as he equalized in the 1–2 defeat against Hamburger SV.

On 15 August 2015, Brandt scored the winning goal after appearing as a substitute in a 2–1 defeat of 1899 Hoffenheim in Bayer's opening match of the 2015–16 Bundesliga season. Between 20 March and 30 April 2016, he scored in six consecutive Bundesliga matches, becoming the youngest player since Gerd Müller to achieve this by scoring 72 seconds into a 2–1 home win over Hertha BSC.

On 26 August 2017, Brandt became the youngest-ever Leverkusen player to reach 100 Bundesliga appearances, doing so at the age 21 years, three months and 25 days during a 2–2 draw against Hoffenheim.

During the second half of the 2018–19 Bundesliga campaign, Brandt was re-positioned by new club manager Peter Bosz, shifting from his natural wide position to a more central role in midfield alongside Kai Havertz. His goal contribution increased as a result of the positional change and in February 2019, after scoring twice and assisting a further four goals, he was nominated for the Player of the Month award. He ultimately won the award and in doing so became the first Leverkusen player to claim the accolade. His brace against Mainz 05 at the start of the month also came on the occasion of his 200th appearance for the club across all competitions.

Borussia Dortmund
Brandt was Dortmund's transfer target after the 23-year-old scored seven league goals, provided eleven assists and subsequently helped Leverkusen to finish fourth in Bundesliga and secure a Champions League third qualifying round spot for next season. On 22 May 2019, Brandt completed a transfer to Borussia Dortmund on a five-year deal for a reported €25 million after Dortmund activated a release clause in his contract. 

Brandt scored his first Bundesliga goal for Borussia Dortmund in his first match, a 5–1 against FC Augsburg on the first matchday, coming on as substitute for Thorgan Hazard.

International career
On 17 May 2016, Brandt was named in Germany's preliminary 27-man squad for UEFA Euro 2016.

He was part of the squad for the 2016 Summer Olympics, where Germany won the silver medal.

On 4 June 2018, Brandt was included in Germany's final 23-man squad for the 2018 FIFA World Cup. On 17 June, Brandt made his first World Cup appearance as a substitute by replacing Timo Werner in the 86th minute in the opening match against Mexico in which they lost 1–0.

Career statistics

Club

International

Scores and results list Germany's goal tally first

Honours
Borussia Dortmund
DFB-Pokal: 2020–21
Germany U19
UEFA European Under-19 Championship: 2014

Germany Olympic
Summer Olympic Games silver medal: 2016

Germany
FIFA Confederations Cup: 2017

Individual
 Fritz Walter Medal U18 Gold: 2014
Bundesliga Team of the Season: 2018–19
Bundesliga Player of the Month: January 2023

References

External links

Profile at the Borussia Dortmund website

Julian Brandt at Kicker.de 

1996 births
Living people
Footballers from Bremen
German footballers
Association football midfielders
Association football wingers
Bayer 04 Leverkusen II players
Bayer 04 Leverkusen players
Borussia Dortmund players
Regionalliga players
Bundesliga players
Germany youth international footballers
Germany under-21 international footballers
Germany international footballers
2017 FIFA Confederations Cup players
2018 FIFA World Cup players
2022 FIFA World Cup players
FIFA Confederations Cup-winning players
Olympic footballers of Germany
Footballers at the 2016 Summer Olympics
Medalists at the 2016 Summer Olympics
Olympic medalists in football
Olympic silver medalists for Germany